Pyae Pyae (born 1 August 2009) is a Burmese child actress. She won Asian Academy Creative Award for Best Actress in a Supporting Role in 2019 with the film The Only Mom. Throughout her career, she has acted in over 20 films and 10 big-screen films as a child actor.

Awards and nominations

Selected filmography

Film (cinema)

Two Worlds (ကမ္ဘာနှစ်ထပ်) (2019)
The Only Mom (လိပ်ပြာစံအိမ်) (2019)
Hit Tine (ဟစ်တိုင်) (2019)
Kyauk Kyauk Kyauk 2 (ကြောက်ကြောက်ကြောက် ၂) (2019)

Short films
A letter to Mom (2016)
OK,I'm fine(2017)

References

Living people
Burmese child actresses
21st-century Burmese actresses
Burmese film actresses
2009 births